State Route 145 (SR 145) is a primary state highway in the U.S. state of Virginia.  The state highway runs  from SR 10 in Chesterfield east to U.S. Route 1 and US 301 in Bellwood in eastern Chesterfield County.

Route description

SR 145 begins at an intersection with SR 10 (Iron Bridge Road) in Chesterfield.  The state highway heads east as two-lane undivided Centralia Road toward the hamlet of Centralia, where the highway has a grade crossing of CSX's North End Subdivision.  Just east of the railroad crossing, SR 145 meets the northern end of SR 144 (Chester Road).  SR 145 turns north onto Chester Road, which is a four-lane divided highway from just south of the SR 144–SR 145 intersection to north of the state highway's diamond interchange with the SR 288 freeway.  North of the freeway, SR 145 closely parallels CSX's Bellwood Subdivision rail line northeast to Bellwood.  There, the highway veers east and makes a 90-degree turn north at Perrymont Road.  SR 145 veers east again and reaches its northern terminus at US 1 and US 301 (Jefferson Davis Highway).

History
SR 145 was added to the state highway system in 1924 as State Route 313, a spur of State Route 31 (now US 1/301). It became State Route 410 in the 1928 renumbering and State Route 145 in the 1933 renumbering.

Major intersections

References

External links

Virginia Highways Project: VA 145

145
State Route 145